Narayan Prakash Saud (commonly known as NP Saud), a member of Nepali Congress, assumed the post of the Minister of Irrigation on 25 February 2014 under Sushil Koirala-led government. He became a Member of Parliament after winning the 2022 general elections.

He was elected to the Pratinidhi Sabha in the 1999 election on behalf of the Nepali Congress. Saud is the NC candidate in the Kanchanpur-2 constituency for the 2008 Constituent Assembly election. Saud was defeated in the December 2017 election. Narayan Prakash Saud won the 2022 general elections with more than 6500 votes and became a member of the house of representatives on behalf of the Nepali Congress. He assumed the office in 22nd of December, 2022.  He got 28100 votes, his nearest representative Nar Bahadur Dhami of CPN-UML got 21645 votes.

References

Living people
Nepali Congress politicians from Sudurpashchim Province
Government ministers of Nepal
Nepal MPs 1999–2002
Members of the 2nd Nepalese Constituent Assembly
Nepal MPs 2022–present
1962 births